Ivkov is a Slavic masculine surname, its feminine counterpart is Ivkova. It may refer to
Borislav Ivkov (1933–2022), Serbian chess Grandmaster 
Kiril Ivkov (born 1946), Bulgarian football player

Bulgarian-language surnames
Serbian surnames